The Owings House is a historic house at 563 Skyline Drive in North Little Rock, Arkansas.  It is a two-story brick building, with classic Spanish Revival features, including a tile roof, arched openings, and iron grillwork.  It is unusual in that its brick has not been stuccoed.  The house was built in 1927 by Justin Matthews as part of his large Edgemont development.  It was the first house to be completed, and was lost by its owners to foreclosure during the Great Depression.

The house was listed on the National Register of Historic Places in 1992.

See also
National Register of Historic Places listings in Pulaski County, Arkansas

References

Houses on the National Register of Historic Places in Arkansas
Mission Revival architecture in Arkansas
Houses completed in 1927
Houses in North Little Rock, Arkansas
National Register of Historic Places in Pulaski County, Arkansas